Šakiai District Municipality is one of 60 municipalities in Lithuania.

References

External links 
 

 
Municipalities of Marijampolė County
Municipalities of Lithuania